Tehuantepecer, or Tehuano wind, is a violent mountain-gap wind that travels through the Chivela Pass in southern Mexico, across the Isthmus of Tehuantepec. It is most common between October and February, with a summer minimum in July. It originates from eastern Mexico and the Bay of Campeche as a post-frontal northerly wind, accelerated southward by cold air damming, that crosses the isthmus and blows through the gap between the Mexican and Guatemalan mountains. The term dates back to at least 1929. This wind can reach gale, storm, even hurricane force. The leading edge of its outflow (or cold front) may form rope cloud over the Gulf of Tehuantepec. These strong winds bring cooler sub-surface waters to the surface of the tropical eastern Pacific Ocean and may last from a few hours to 6 days.

Climatology

The synoptic condition is associated with the formation of high-pressure systems in Sierra Madre in the wake of an advancing cold front. Tehuantepecers primarily occur during the cold season months for the region in the wake of cold fronts, between October and February, with a summer minimum in July caused by the westward extension of the Azores-Bermuda high pressure system. Wind magnitude is greater during El Niño years than during La Niña years, due to the more frequent cold frontal incursions during El Niño winters. The wind's direction is from the north to north-northeast. It leads to a localized acceleration of the trade winds in the region, and can enhance thunderstorm activity when it interacts with the Intertropical Convergence Zone. The effects can last from a few hours to six days.

As seen by weather satellites

Its leading edge shows up as a rope cloud within the visible and infrared channels of weather satellite images, and since it lies at the leading edge of a density (temperature and dew point) discontinuity, its leading edge by definition it is a cold front, though it has also been described as a squall line, with embedded rain squalls sometimes seen. Within polar orbiting imagery, a corridor of strong low-level winds show up this feature within scatterometer data retrievals, with its leading edge at the south to southwest edge of the wind surge.

Ocean impact
Tehuantepecers can be felt up to  out to sea in the tropical eastern Pacific Ocean. Its effects can appear similar to a tropical cyclone, though the sky is usually clear. The surface wind can also change local ocean currents during an event. These strong winds upwell sub-surface waters, cooling the tropical eastern Pacific Ocean by as much as 14 °F (9 °C), and may last 4–7 days.

References

Other reading
Steenburgh, W.J., D.M. Schultz, B.A. Colle, 1998: The Structure and Evolution of Gap Outflow over the Gulf of Tehuantepec, Mexico. Monthly Weather Review, Vol. 126, pp. 2673–2691
Bourassa MA, Zamudio L, O’Brien JJ, Noninertial flow in NSCAT observations of Tehuantepec winds, Journal of Geophysical Research-Oceans, 104 (C5): 11311-11319 MAY 15 1999
Chelton DB, Freilich MH, Esbensen SK, Satellite observations of the wind jets off the Pacific coast of Central America. Part I: Case studies and statistical characteristics, Monthly Weather Review, 128 (7): 1993-2018 Part 1 JUL 2000

Winds